The men's 4 × 400 metres relay event at the 1994 Commonwealth Games was held on 27 and 28 August at the Centennial Stadium in Victoria, British Columbia.

Medalists

* Athletes who competed in heats only and received medals.

Results

Heats

Final

References

Relay
1994